Tetrahydroxyflavone may refer to:

 Isoscutellarein (5,7,8,4'-Tetrahydroxyflavone)
 Luteolin (3',4',5,7-Tetrahydroxyflavone)
 Norartocarpetin (2',4',5,7-Tetrahydroxyflavone)
 Scutellarein (5,6,7,4'-Tetrahydroxyflavone)